This article is about the demographic features of the population of Equatorial Guinea, including population density, ethnicity, education level, health of the populace, economic status, religious affiliations and other aspects of the population.

Population 

According to the 2022 revision of the world factbook the total population was 1,679,172 in 2022. The proportion of children below the age of 14 in 2020 was 38.73%, 57.35% was between 15 and 65 years of age, while 3.92% was 65 years or older.

Population Estimates by Sex and Age Group (01.VII.2020):

Vital statistics 
Registration of vital events is in Equatorial Guinea not complete. The Population Department of the United Nations prepared the following estimates.

Fertility and births
Total Fertility Rate (TFR) (Wanted Fertility Rate) and Crude Birth Rate (CBR):

Fertility data as of 2011 (DHS Program):

Life expectancy

Ethnic groups

Peoples considered as natives 
The majority of the people of Equatorial Guinea are of Niger-Congo origin. The largest ethnic group, the Fang, are indigenous to the mainland, but substantial migration to Bioko Island has resulted in Fang dominance over the earlier Bubi inhabitants. The Fang constitute 80% of the population and are themselves divided into 67 clans. Those in the northern part of Rio Muni speak Fang-Ntumu, while those in the south speak Fang-Okah; the two dialects are mutually unintelligible. The Bubi, who constitute 15% of the population, are indigenous to Bioko Island.

In addition, there are coastal ethnic groups, collectively referred to as Ndowe or Playeros ("Beach People" in Spanish): Combes, Bujebas, Balengues and Bengas on the mainland and small islands and a Fernandino community of Krio descended people on Bioko. Together, these groups compose 5% of the population.

Two small groups of Pygmies also inhabit the country, the Beyele and the Bokuign, the former being located in the Altos de Nsork region. Their population is dwindling, them being subjected to heavy pressure from their neighbours, who don't even consider them as human.

8,800 black and white mixed race people, named Fernandino peoples, also live in Equatorial Guinea. The Asian Africans, the Fernandino peoples and the White Africans represent 10% of the total population of Equatorial Guinea.

Recently immigrated peoples 
Some Europeans (largely of Spanish or Portuguese descent) – among them mixed with African ethnicity – also live in the nation. Most Spaniards left after independence. There is a growing number of foreigners from neighboring Cameroon, Nigeria, and Gabon. Equatorial Guinea received Asians and black Africans from other countries as workers on cocoa and coffee plantations. In the late 20th century, Equatorial Guinea became home to more than 80,000 Hispanics from Mexico, Central America, and other Spanish speaking nations in the Americas. 17,000 Spanish people and 5,000 Chinese people also live in Equatorial Guinea. The non-Africans living in Equatorial Guinea represent almost 10% of the nation's total population. Other black Africans came from Liberia, Angola, and Mozambique, and Asians are mostly Chinese with small numbers of Indians. Equatorial Guinea also allowed many fortune-seeking European settlers of other nationalities, including British, French and Germans. After independence, thousands of Equatorial Guineans went to Spain. Another 100,000 Equatorial Guineans went to Cameroon, Gabon, and Nigeria because of dictatorship of Francisco Macías Nguema. Some of its communities also live in Brazil, United States, Spain, Colombia, Mexico, Argentina, Peru, Portugal, and France.

Languages 

Spanish, French and Portuguese are the official languages and spoken as second languages. Spanish is the language of education, and for this reason a majority of the population (about 88%) can speak it, though only about 10–15% have a high competence in the language. Annobonese speak a Portuguese Creole, named Annobonese, as their first language. Asian migrants and descendants of European settlers (mostly Spaniards, Britons and Portuguese) usually speak their ancestral languages along with Spanish. Other Africans usually speak their native languages and their nation's official languages – English and Igbo for Nigerians; English for Cameroonians and Liberians; French for Cameroonians and Gabonese; and Portuguese for Angolans and Mozambicans. The latter was made an official language since July 13, 2007. 82% of first foreign language learners choose the French language and 18% the English language. The Roman Catholic Church has greatly influenced both religion and education.

Languages of traditional names
Equatoguineans tend to have both a Spanish first name and an African first and last name. When written, the Spanish and African first names are followed by the father's first name (which becomes the principal surname) and the mother's first name. Thus people may have up to four names, with a different surname for each generation.

Other demographic statistics 
Demographic statistics according to the World Population Review in 2022.
One birth every 11 minutes	
One death every 41 minutes	
One net migrant every 41 minutes	
Net gain of one person every 11 minutes

The following demographic statistics are from the CIA World Factbook.

Population
1,679,173 (2022 est.)
836,178 (July 2020 est.)
note: 2002 census results claim 1,015,000 residents, although this most likely was inflated in anticipation for the December election.

Languages
Spanish (official) 67.6%, other (includes Fang, Bubi, Portuguese (official), French (official), Portuguese-based Creoles spoken in Ano Bom) 32.4% (1994 est.)

Religions
Roman Catholic 80%, Protestant 5%, Muslim 2%, other 5% (animist, Baha'i, Jewish) (2010 est.)

Age structure

0-14 years: 38.73% (male 164,417 /female 159,400)
15-24 years: 19.94% (male 84,820 /female 81,880)
25-54 years: 32.72% (male 137,632 /female 135,973)
55-64 years: 4.69% (male 17,252 /female 22,006)
65 years and over: 3.92% (male 13,464 /female 19,334) (2020 est.)

Population growth rate
3.5% (2022 est.) Country comparison to the world: 5th
2.35% (2020 est.) Country comparison to the world: 29th

Birth rate
29.95 births/1,000 population (2022 est.) Country comparison to the world: 30th
30.7 births/1,000 population (2020 est.) Country comparison to the world: 31st

Death rate
8.95 deaths/1,000 population (2022 est.) Country comparison to the world: 62nd
7.3 deaths/1,000 population (2020 est.) Country comparison to the world: 112th

Total fertility rate
4.26 children born/woman (2022 est.) Country comparison to the world: 24th
4.11 children born/woman (2020 est.) Country comparison to the world: 29th

Median age
total: 20.3 years. Country comparison to the world: 192nd
male: 19.9 years 
female: 20.7 years (2020 est.)

Contraceptive prevalence rate
12.6% (2011)

Net migration rate
13.96 migrant(s)/1,000 population (2022 est.) Country comparison to the world: 3rd
0 migrant(s)/1,000 population (2020 est.) Country comparison to the world: 81st

Dependency ratios
total dependency ratio: 72.16 (2022 est.)
youth dependency ratio: 60.5 (2020 est.)
elderly dependency ratio: 3.9 (2020 est.)
potential support ratio: 25.5 (2020 est.)

Urbanization
urban population: 74% of total population (2022)
rate of urbanization: 3.62% annual rate of change (2020-25 est.)

urban population: 73.1% of total population (2020)
rate of urbanization: 4.28% annual rate of change (2015–20 est.)

Sex ratio
at birth:
1.03 male(s)/female
under 15 years:
1.03 male(s)/female
15–64 years:
0.93 male(s)/female
65 years and over:
0.7 male(s)/female
total population:
1 male(s)/female (2020 est.)

Life expectancy at birth
total population: 63.7 years. Country comparison to the world: 206th
male: 61.44 years
female: 66.03 years (2022 est.)

total population: 65.7 years (2020 est.) Country comparison to the world: 192nd
male: 64.4 years (2020 est.)
female: 66.9 years (2020 est.)

Literacy
definition: age 15 and over can read and write (2015 est.)
total population: 95.3% (2015 est.)
male: 97.4% (2015 est.)
female: 93% (2015 est.)

Major infectious diseases
degree of risk: very high (2020)
food or waterborne diseases: bacterial and protozoal diarrhea, hepatitis A, and typhoid fever
vectorborne diseases: malaria and dengue fever
animal contact diseases: rabies

See also

Equatorial Guinea

References